Charles Emmett Mack (November 25, 1900 – March 17, 1927), was an American film actor during the silent film era. He appeared in seventeen films between 1916 and 1927.

Biography
Born Charles Emmett McNerney in Scranton, Pennsylvania, to an Irish family, at a young age Mack could speak three or four languages. One of Mack's early jobs was as a peanut vendor at the Ringling Brothers Circus. After that, he appeared in vaudeville, specializing in buck-and-wing dancing. Later he became a tour guide for D.W. Griffith's Mamaroneck Studios. After that he was Griffith's prop man, fetching all sorts of props for the director.

One day, Griffith invited Mack to rehearse a scene from Dream Street with him. Mack enjoyed the part he had and thought Griffith was friendly. He ended up playing the lead.

While filming America in 1924, a soldier's arm was blown off. As Mack recalls, "Neil Hamilton and I went to neighboring towns and raised a fund for him—I doing a song and dance and Neil collecting a coin."

Death
After signing with Warner Brothers, Mack was killed in an automobile accident on his way to a racetrack to film an auto racing scene for the film The First Auto (1927). He was twenty-six years old.

Mack was survived by his wife, Marion Mack and her twelve-year-old adopted daughter and three-year-old son. She was born in Italy and came to the United States when she was three. A 1929 issue of Picture-Play revealed that it was anticipated that she would perhaps become a leading actress, but it doesn't seem her career ever went past bit parts. She is not to be confused with the other Marion Mack.

Filmography

 Dolly's Scoop (1916)
 Dream Street (1921) 
 One Exciting Night (1922)
 Driven (1923)
 The White Rose (1923)
 The Daring Years (1923)
 America (1924)
 The Sixth Commandment (1924)
 Youth for Sale (1924)
 Bad Company (1925)
 Down Upon the Suwanee River (1925)
 A Woman of the World (1925)
 The Devil's Circus (1926)
 The Unknown Soldier (1926)
 Old San Francisco (1927)
 The First Auto (1927)
 The Rough Riders (1927)

References

External links

1900 births
1927 deaths
American male film actors
American male silent film actors
Actors from Scranton, Pennsylvania
Road incident deaths in California
20th-century American male actors
Male actors from Pennsylvania